is a 1989 2D beat 'em up arcade game developed by Alpha Denshi and published by SNK.

Plot
The setting takes place in New York City, following martial artists Mike and Jackie, who heard an evil gang led by the antagonist, Jaguar, are terrorizing the city. Jaguar also kidnapped a young woman named Cynthia. Mike and Jackie must fight through parts of New York City (including Chinatown, Manhattan) to return peace to New York City, and defeat Jaguar to save Cynthia.

Gameplay

In Gang Wars, up to two players can control two different characters with different fighting styles. The movements are composed of two attack types (punch and kick), as jumping to fight against enemies or overcome obstacles. Players have access to a repertoire of techniques by pushing these buttons individually or in combination. The characters can also pick up weapons for hitting, throwing projectiles and firearms. At the end of each stage the players can customise the characters' three fighting statistics (Power, Speed and Guard) depending on the number of points they have. Higher end stage scores grant more customisation points.

Reception 
In Japan, Game Machine listed Gang Wars on their July 15, 1989 issue as being the third most-successful table arcade unit of the month, outperforming titles like Golden Axe.

See also
Ninja Combat
Ninja Commando

References

External links
Gang Wars at Arcade Database

Gang Wars at arcade-history

1989 video games
ADK (company) games
Arcade video games
SNK beat 'em ups
PlayStation Network games
Multiplayer and single-player video games
Organized crime video games
Video games scored by Hiroaki Shimizu
Video games scored by Yuka Watanabe
Video games developed in Japan